Turritella carinifera is a species of sea snail, a marine gastropod mollusk in the family Turritellidae.

Description

Distribution

References

 Sowerby III, G. B. (1900). On some marine shells from Pondoland and the Kowie, with descriptions of seventeen new species. Proceedings of the Malacological Society of London. 4(1): 1–7
 Tomlin, J. R. le B. (1925) Reports on the Marine Mollusca in the Collections of the South African Museum. Annals of the South African Museum. Vol. 20(4) (7), pp. 309–316.
 Turton W.H. (1932). Marine Shells of Port Alfred, S. Africa. Humphrey Milford, London, xvi + 331 pp., 70 pls.
 Kilburn, R.N. & Rippey, E. (1982) Sea Shells of Southern Africa. Macmillan South Africa, Johannesburg, xi + 249 pp.

External links
 Lamarck [J.-B. M.] de. (1822). Histoire naturelle des animaux sans vertèbres. Tome septième. Paris: published by the Author, 711 pp
 Reeve, L.A. (1849). Monograph of the genus Turritella. In: Conchologia Iconica. vol. 5, pl. 1–11 and unpaginated text. L. Reeve & Co., London
  Branch, G. M. (2002). Two Oceans. 5th impression. David Philip, Cate Town & Johannesburg

Turritellidae
Gastropods described in 1822